Voice Mate formerly called Quick Voice and later on as Q Voice is an intelligent personal assistant and knowledge navigator which is only available as a built-in application for various LG smartphones. The application uses a natural language user interface to answer questions, make recommendations, and perform actions by delegating requests to a set of Web services. It is based on the Maluuba personal assistant.

Some of the capabilities of Voice Mate include making appointments, opening apps, setting alarms, updating social network websites such as Facebook or Twitter and navigation. Voice Mate also offers efficient multitasking as well as automatic activation features, for example when the car engine is started.

Devices

 LG Optimus Vu 
 LG Optimus LTE II
 LG Optimus L3
 LG Optimus L5
 LG Optimus L5 II
 LG Optimus L7
 LG Optimus L9
 LG Optimus L9 II
 LG Optimus Vu II
 LG Optimus F3
 LG Optimus F5 
 LG Optimus F6
 LG Optimus F7
 LG Optimus G
 LG Optimus G Pro
 LG G2 
 LG G Pro 2
 LG G Pad 8.3
 LG Vu 3
 LG G Flex
 LG Volt
 LG G3
 LG G4

References

Natural language processing software
Virtual assistants
LG Electronics